CTNNA3, also known as αT-catenin and Catenin alpha-3, is a protein that in humans is encoded by the CTNNA3 gene

References